is a Japanese manga series written and illustrated by Kouji Mori. It was serialized in Hakusensha's seinen manga magazine Young Animal from November 2008 to August 2016, with its chapters collected in seventeen tankōbon volumes. A prequel series, titled Muhōtō, was serialized in the same magazine from February 2019 to July 2022, with its chapters collected in six tankōbon volumes.

Publication
Hakusensha collected its chapters in seventeen tankōbon volumes, released from August 28, 2009, to October 28, 2016.

A prequel, titled , was serialized in Young Animal from February 8, 2019, to July 22, 2022. Hakusensha collected its chapters in six tankōbon volumes, released from September 27, 2019, to September 29, 2022.

Volume list

Jisatsutō

Muhōtō

Reception
As of February 2019, Jisatsutō had 3 million copies in circulation.

References

Further reading

External links
  
  
 

Hakusensha manga
Seinen manga
Survival anime and manga
Suspense anime and manga